The County Ground in Lakenham, Norwich, Norfolk was a cricket ground for over two hundred years, hosting both first-class and List A cricket. Five first-class games, all involving touring international sides, were played here between 1912 and 1986,
and 13 List A matches were staged between 1969 and 1998.
The County Ground's most regular users, however, were Norfolk County Cricket Club, who played over 400 Minor Counties Championship games at the venue.
In the early 21st century the ground was redeveloped for a variety of other uses.

Records

First-class
 Highest team total: 425/5 declared by West Indians v Minor Counties, 1950
 Lowest team total: 79 by England XI v Australians, 1912
 Highest individual innings: 117 by Gerry Gomez for West Indians v Minor Counties, 1950
 Best bowling in an innings: 7-33 by Sonny Ramadhin for West Indians v Minor Counties, 1950
 Best bowling in a match: 9-106 by Evan Gray for New Zealanders v Minor Counties, 1986

List A
 Highest team total: 309 by Worcestershire v Norfolk, 1994
 Lowest team total: 52 (26.5 overs) by Minor Counties v Lancashire, 1998
 Highest individual innings: 138 by Chris Adams for Derbyshire v Minor Counties, 1997
 Best bowling in an innings: 6-48 by Tracey Moore for Norfolk v Yorkshire, 1969

References

Defunct cricket grounds in England
Cricket grounds in Norfolk
Sports venues in Norwich